Sharp Edge may refer to:
 Sharp Edge (Blencathra), an arête in the Lake District
 Sharp Edge (horse), a racehorse
 Operation Sharp Edge, carried out by the United States Marine Corps in Liberia in 1990 and 1991
 Sharp Edge, a character in the anime series Super Life-Form Transformers: Beast Wars Neo

See also 
 Sharp Edges, a novel